Albert Jenkins (11 March 1895 – 7 October 1953) was an international rugby player for Wales and played club rugby for Llanelli RFC between 1919 and 1928. Jenkins was one of the greatest backs to have played for Llanelli and is compared to later Scarlet heroes Lewis Jones and Phil Bennett. Jenkins was a strong tackler and was an extremely fast runner from a standing start. He was also an excellent kicker with either foot and could punt the ball half the length of the pitch. He was sometimes criticised for his decision making on the field, and wasn't at his best away from Stradey Park.

In the book Stradey Stories, author  comments, "such was his drawing power that if by some quirk of fate, Albert could not take to the field because of injury or work commitment (he was a steelworker), the fans would leave the stadium in droves and not bother to watch the ensuing match."

Jenkins is seen as one of Llanelli's greatest players but he was at his peak when Welsh rugby was at one of its worst points in its history.

Club career
Jenkins played for Llanelli juniors but on the outbreak of the First World War Jenkins joined the British Army and served in France in the 38th Welsh Regiment. 
The 38th Welsh Regiment fought at the Somme, Ypres and Epehy, three most gruelling, gruesome and vicious battles. He served his country with distinction in one of the most horrific and bloody conflicts in history.

On his return in 1919, Jenkins rejoined Llanelli and gained a position in the senior team. He would later play for Llanelli against the New Zealand All Blacks, losing in 1924, but beating them 3–0 in 1926.

International career
Jenkins played fourteen matches for Wales, his first cap was against England on 14 January 1920 just four months after his Llanelli debut. His greatest international was the game against Ireland in 1920 when Jenkins set up three tries for club mate Bryn Williams, scored a try himself, kicked two of the resulting conversions and was successful with a drop goal attempt. In the 1921 game against Scotland, Jenkins played with incredible commitment, but on occasions it appeared he was playing the Scots on his own due to the poor performance of the rest of the Welsh team.

Jenkins would go on to captain Wales twice, his first against Ireland in 1923, losing both games.

In 1950 a tribute match was held in his honour at Stradey Park.

Jenkins died on 7 October 1953 and was buried at Box cemetery, Llanelli. 
Norman Lewis of Llanelli wrote "Jenkins seemed to youthful eyes a mystical figure imbued with powers the rest could only dream about"

International matches played
Wales
  1920, 1923
  1920, 1921, 1922, 1923
   1920, 1923, 1928
  1920, 1921, 1923, 1928
  1924

Bibliography

References

1895 births
1953 deaths
British Army personnel of World War I
Llanelli RFC players
Rugby union centres
Rugby union players from Llanelli
Wales international rugby union players
Wales rugby union captains
Welch Regiment soldiers
Welsh rugby union players